Oh, Play That Thing (2004) is a novel by Irish writer Roddy Doyle. It is Vol. 2 of The Last Roundup series, and follows on from Vol. 1, A Star Called Henry.

Plot summary
Having fallen foul of his erstwhile comrades in the Irish Republican Army (IRA), Henry escapes to America. In New York City, he becomes involved in advertising, pornography and bootlegging. After stepping on the toes of the Mob, Henry heads for Chicago, where he becomes the manager and partner-in-crime of Louis Armstrong. He becomes reunited with his wife and daughter, and, much to his dismay, the IRA.

2004 Irish novels
Novels by Roddy Doyle
Jonathan Cape books